The Brule River is a  river in the U.S. states of Michigan and Wisconsin. Nearly the entire course forms a portion of the boundary between the two states.

The Brule River is stocked with many types of trout. These include Brook, and Brown trout

The Brule's flow is much more reliable than many other surrounding rivers, due to its "untouched" quality. There is only one dam on the river that affects the water level, but that is located on Brule Island near the end of the Brule just below the Paint River.

Much of the land on both sides of the river is publicly owned with several good campsites available.  Fishing is exceptional, with brook and brown trout in the upper areas and tributaries.  Smallmouth bass and northern pike can be found in abundance in the lower sections.

References

Rivers of Michigan
Rivers of Wisconsin
Rivers of Iron County, Michigan
Bodies of water of Florence County, Wisconsin
Rivers of Forest County, Wisconsin
Tributaries of Lake Michigan